The 1919 Texas Mines Miners football team was an American football team that represented the Texas School of Mines (now known as the University of Texas at El Paso) during the 1919 college football season. In its fifth and final season under head coach Tommy Dwyer, the team compiled a 24 record and was outscored by a total of 131 to 67.

Schedule

References

Texas Mines
UTEP Miners football seasons
Texas Mines Miners football